Al Bayda Stadium, otherwise known as Al Watheeq al Khadhraa Stadium or is a multi-purpose stadium in Bayda, Libya.  It is currently used mostly for football matches and is the home ground of Al Akhdar Al Bayda'.  The stadium holds 10,000 people.

References

External links
Stadium information

Sports venues in Libya
Football venues in Libya
Multi-purpose stadiums in Libya